The  TVR Tamora is a 2-seater sports car built from 2002 by British automobile manufacturer TVR, filling the gap left by the company's Chimaera and Griffith models. Introduced at the 2000 Birmingham Motor Show, the car is named after Tamora, a character in William Shakespeare's play Titus Andronicus and served as an entry-level model in the TVR range. Peter Wheeler was no longer directly responsible for design and the car was designed by a team led by Damian McTaggart (also responsible for the interior), but Wheeler still had final approval.

History and development 
The Tamora was intended to be a more practical and urban-friendly model in the TVR range. Based on the Tuscan Speed Six, the Tamora used the same chassis and suspension as the Tuscan. The engine was a short-stroked version of the 4.0 litre Speed Six found on the Tuscan now displacing 3.6 litres. Keeping with TVR tradition, the car still lacked driver's aids such as ABS and traction control, but was fitted with a power steering and a softer clutch for easy maneuverability. The Tamora was not a sales success due to reliability issues, high price and divisive styling. Only 350 cars were made before it was discontinued in 2006.

Specifications 

The braking system was manufactured by AP Racing. The suspension is a double wishbone setup at all four corners. Standard wheels are 16×7 inch aluminium, with 225/50ZR-16 Avon ZZ3 tyres, although most cars were ordered with 18" wheels and 225/35/18 tyres on the front, 235/40/18 on the rear.

It weighs  with 58/42 weight distribution. 

The interior featured leather upholstery with aluminium switches and an adjustable steering column. The Tamora came with amenities such as central locking, electrically operated windows, boot release and wing mirrors and an engine immobiliser which turned off the engine in unfavourable driving conditions.

The Tamora also provided the base for the T350 coupé.

References

External links 

 Tamora Owners register

Tamora
Sports cars
Rear-wheel-drive vehicles
Coupés
Cars introduced in 2002